Lou Degni (January 6, 1933 – January 7, 2022), known professionally as Mark Forest, was an American actor, opera singer and bodybuilder — widely known as the protagonist in a series of 1960s sword and sandal or peplum movies — including his recurring role as Maciste.

Life and career
Born Lorenzo Louis (Lou) Degni in Brooklyn, NY, Forest was a third generation Italian-American; his grandparents were from Naples. He began bodybuilding at 13, subsequently opening his own gym in Long Island. A talent scout saw his picture and invited him to Hollywood to audition for the role of Tarzan. Though he did not get the part, he became a member of the musclemen troupe in Mae West's Las Vegas stage show. During this time he entered numerous weightlifting competitions, winning the title of "Mr. Muscle Beach" in Venice, California.

After the worldwide success of Hercules, he became the second American actor recruited by Italian producers (after Steve Reeves), and was signed to a three-picture contract with La vendetta di Ercole  (retitled Goliath and the Dragon) as his first film for the US market. At this time Degni began using the pseudonym Mark Forest, and using his advantage of speaking fluent Italian prior to arriving in Europe. For the English version of the film he was dubbed by Jackson Beck who voiced Bluto in the Popeye cartoons.

Forest continued in the peplum genre, active in Rome from 1961-1965, leaving the cinema to pursue a career as a European opera singer (tenor), skilled in the bel canto technique, instructed by Giovanni Millo, composer and former tenor of the Metropolitan Opera of New York, father of the lyric soprano Aprile Millo. In his later years, Forest became a vocal coach in Studio City, California.  

He later lived in Arleta, California, and died on January 7, 2022, a day after his 89th birthday.

Filmography

References

Notes

External links

Mark Forest at Brians Drive in Theater

1933 births
2022 deaths
20th-century American male actors
American bodybuilders
American male film actors
American people of Italian descent
Male actors from New York City
People associated with physical culture
Sportspeople from Brooklyn